Pedro Jorge Pires Fernandes Lemos (born 17 March 1993) is a Portuguese footballer who plays as a midfielder.

Club career
He made his Primeira Liga debut for Vitória Guimarães on 17 February 2013 in a game against Moreirense.

References

External links

1993 births
Sportspeople from Guimarães
Living people
Portuguese footballers
Association football midfielders
Vitória S.C. B players
Vitória S.C. players
Gil Vicente F.C. players
Vilaverdense F.C. players
F.C. Penafiel players
Ermis Aradippou FC players
Primeira Liga players
Liga Portugal 2 players
Campeonato de Portugal (league) players
Cypriot First Division players
Portuguese expatriate footballers
Expatriate footballers in Cyprus
Portuguese expatriate sportspeople in Cyprus